Thomas Alroe McLachlan (1912–1986) was an Australian rugby league footballer who played in the New South Wales Rugby League (NSWRL).

Playing career
A South Sydney junior, McLachlan  made his 1st grade debut for that club in 1931.

In 1934, McLachlan joined the Eastern Suburbs club where he remained until his retirement at the end of the 1937 Season. A , McLachlan played in some of East's greatest sides, winning premierships with the club in 1935, 1936 and 1937. He was also a member of the Eastern Suburbs side that was defeated by Western Suburbs in the 1934 premiership decider.

Post playing
McLachlan went on to become president of the Australian Postal Workers’ Union.

References

Sources
 The Encyclopedia Of Rugby League; Alan Whiticker & Glen Hudson
From Where The Sun Rises; Ian Heads, Geoff Armstrong & David Middleton

Australian rugby league players
Sydney Roosters players
1912 births
1986 deaths
Rugby league hookers
South Sydney Rabbitohs players